Wide Swing Tremolo is the third studio album by alternative country band Son Volt. It was released in 1998 on Warner Bros. Records.

The album peaked at No. 93 on the Billboard 200.

Production
The album was recorded in Millstadt, Illinois, at the band's rehearsal space. It was produced by the band and engineered by David Barbe.

Critical reception
Entertainment Weekly wrote that "many of the songs ... return to the power and purity of the band’s brilliant 1995 debut, Trace. Trouser Press called the album "genuinely mediocre," writing that "the flourishes that had initially made Son Volt uncanny had transgressed into stale formula." The Tucson Weekly wrote that "the songs retain Farrar's downcast approach, but they're extremely well-written this time around; and the band seems to have been reinvigorated, putting a little more into their performances than the cultivated ennui we've become accustomed to."

Track listing
All songs written by Jay Farrar. 
 "Straightface" - 3:02
 "Driving the View" - 2:57
 "Jodel" - 0:41
 "Medicine Hat" - 4:12
 "Strands" - 5:06
 "Flow" - 2:18
 "Dead Man's Clothes" - 2:46
 "Right on Through" - 3:08
 "Chanty" - 1:27
 "Carry You Down" - 3:28
 "Question" - 4:00
 "Streets That Time Walks" - 5:24
 "Hanging Blue Side" - 3:41
 "Blind Hope" - 3:17

Personnel
 Jay Farrar - guitars, lead vocals, Chamberlin organ, acoustic and electric pianos, dulcimer, harmonica
 Dave Boquist - guitars, lap steel guitar, fiddle, viola
 Jim Boquist - bass, backing vocals, slide guitar (4), piano (7)
 Mike Heidorn - drums, percussion
 Eric Heywood - pedal steel guitar (13, 14)
 Dave Barbe - Kenyan rattle (13)

References

Son Volt albums
1998 albums
Warner Records albums